Metropolis is an internationally recognised design and architecture–concentrated magazine with a strong focus on ethics, innovation and sustainability in the creative sector. The magazine was established in 1981 by Horace Havemeyer III of Bellerophon Publications, Inc alongside his wife Eugenie Cowan Havemeyer and is based in New York City. Metropolis’s work towards future focused is based in their motto “design at all scales”.

The magazine is published ten times a year with over 50,000 subscribers. Metropolis publishes both print and digital editorial coverage encouraging design focused conversation through a range of diverse mediums. Metropolis produces digital media for their website and social accounts. Their website receives approximately 85,000 unique visitors every month while its socials amass an audience of over 100,000 followers across Instagram and Facebook combined. In 2019 Metropolis was acquired by Sandow Media for an undisclosed amount. Metropolis annually hosts a range of virtual and in-person events alongside design competition schemes encouraging innovation and sustainability .

History
Metropolis was launched in 1981 by Horace Havemeyer III (1942–2014)  and Eugenie Cowan Havemeyer. Havemeyer III was born in Dix Hills moving to New York City in 1969 where he worked at Doubleday publishers as a production planning supervisor for a decade. He went on to completed courses at the Institute for Architecture and Urban Studies prompting his work at the IAUS journal, Skyline until it closed. In 1981, he founded Bellerophon Publications alongside his wife, serving as publishing body and founders of Metropolis magazine. As evidenced in early editions, the magazine began with a particular focus on architecture in New York City and quickly expanded to embrace a range of design disciplines internationally.

In 1985 Suzan S. Szenasy took over as the editor-in-chief of Metropolis. As a contemporary figurehead in design and innovation and notable “voice of the design world”  Szenasy led Metropolis to international acclaim. Szenasy’s influence addressed sustainability and inclusive design on the stage of a mainstream publication before familiarity of such practices was attracted.

Metropolis’values largely surrounded Szenasy’s writings, which emphasise the importance of ethics and sustainable intervention in the education and practices of designers.

In 2017 Avinash Rajagopal took over from Szenasy as the editor-in-chief of Metropolis as Szenasy moved into a new role as Director of Design Innovation. Rajagopal’s role as editor-in-chief  followed his success as Metropolis’s senior editor from 2011-2016. In 2019 Rajagopal worked alongside Eugenie Havemeyer in Sandow Media’s acquisition of the magazine to their portfolio.

Editors-In-Chief
 Horace Havemeyer III, 1981- 1986
 Susan S. Szenasy, 1986- 2017 
 Avinash Rajagopal, 2017–present; assumed this role after working as senior editor at the magazine from 2011-2016.

Influence
Metropolis is centered around futurism in its focus on the innovative needs of consumers and the planet. The magazine investigates the role designers can play in reversing the climate crisis by rejecting developments founded on self-interest and monetary gain. With a strong focus on futurist ideals and sustainability Metropolis encourages affirmative action in developing a progressive and environmentally enduring world.

Futurism and Sustainability
Metropolis is heavily inspired aesthetically and culturally by futurist values. It focuses significantly on the technological progress of the modern machine age, eagerly anticipating vitality and progression of design and architectural realms. The magazine embraces an artistic futurist aesthetic, frequently applying neo-impressionism and cubism in its covers as a direct reflection of the dynamism of modernity the magazine embodies. 

The magazine remains heavily influenced by the work and writings of former editor Susan S. Szenasy due to the accuracy at which she was able to anticipate changing realities within design from the 80’s to the present moment.

As part of Metropolis’s 40th anniversary the magazine republished old pieces that anticipated trends in design that remain pertinent today with a particular focus on “work, sustainability, the wellness movement, the concept of reuse, gender issues, accessibility and the new digital technologies.”  The articles republished were included online and within print supplements entitled “40 Years of Looking Forward”. Editor-in-chief Avinash Rajagopal wrote in the July/August 2021 issue of Metropolis: 
The republished work included:

 March 1989—This issue featured an article by Susan S. Szenasy entitled “Making Home Work” with exact parallels to the Covid-19 work from home movement.
 May 1989—Featured an article entitled “Building with the Sun” by Don Prowler focalising the emergence of the sustainability movement.
 October 1996 – Included the article, “Well-Being,” by Barry M. Katz introduced this concept to designers.
 May 1999 – “The Mall Doctor,” by Ellen Barr campaigned for reuse over reconstruction in architecture.

Metropolis’s embodiment of futurism and sustainability thereby encourages a “coexistence with future generations for the premonition, and anticipatory belief in future formulas”.

Notable Volumes 
The following table highlights volumes of Metropolis considered notable within the design community. The listed issues are significant due to contentious and innovative design thinking.

‌Competition 
Metropolis hosts a range of creative competitions annually to encourage innovation and forward thinking among contemporary design practitioners. The magazines most notable award schemes are the annual ‘Next Generation Design Competition’, ‘Planet Positive Awards’ and the ‘Future 100’.

Next Generation Design 
Metropolis annually hosts the ‘Next Generation Design Competition’ alongside Staples Business Advantage. The competition encourages experienced designers to create based around five major themes: collaboration, wellness, effectiveness and productivity, office culture, and sustainability. The competition awards victors with $10 000 in venture capital to encourage production, with the only eligibility criteria being entrants must have been practicing for a decade or less are eligible.

Planet Positive Awards 
The ‘Planet Positive Awards’ recognise sustainable creative projects and products internationally that benefit both people and the planet. The competition inaugurally occurred in 2021. Project eligibility included sustainable architecture and interior design projects developed over the past three years dating from June 2018-June 2021, and sustainable products released between June 2019-June 2021. As a prerequisite to entrance all competition entries must recognise they are targeting sustainability through official sustainability certifications. The ‘Planet Positive Award’ winners were published in the November/December 2021 issue of the magazine, Volume 41, No 6 and recognised formally in a virtual awards ceremony facilitated by Sandow through their Design TV platform.

Award Recipients 
The awards were grouped into seven categories for judgement including: civic/cultural, workplace, healthcare, multifamily, hospitality, education, and products.

Future 100 
Metropolis’s ‘Future 100’ awards act as the connector of top tier architectural talent with leading design firms. The award recognises the top 100 graduating students from interior and architecture design programs in the United States and Canada. Award recipients will be featured in Metropolis on both print and digital scales, alongside recognition of their programs, nominators, and school.

The inaugural ‘Future 100’ interior design and architecture graduating students were named in 2021 and can be found on the Metropolis website.

Awards 
In 2007 and 2008 Metropolis was a finalist in the National Magazine Awards in the ‘Under 100,000 Circulation’ category for General Excellence. This award honours effectiveness and overall excellence in which “writing, reporting, editing, and design all come together to command readers attention and fulfill the magazines unique editorial decision”.

In 2007 Havemeyer III, Szenasy and Metropolis won the CIVITAS August Heckscher Award  "for their twenty-five years pursuing enlightened and intelligent documentation of life in urban America, especially New York City".

In 2009 Havemeyer III was awarded the Institute Honor for Collaborative Achievement by the American Institute of Architects on behalf of Metropolis magazine.

In 2017, Susan S. Szenasy (Metropolis’s editor-in-chief from 1986 to 2017) received the Cooper–Hewitt, Smithsonian Design Museum's Director's Award in recognition of her work at Metropolis and beyond.

References

External links
Metropolis website

Visual arts magazines published in the United States
Architecture magazines
Design magazines
Magazines established in 1981
Magazines published in New York City
Ten times annually magazines